Little Fighter is a single and multiplayer beat 'em up game designed and developed by Marti Wong. It was released in 1995.

Gameplay 
In this game, players can choose to play as one of 11 characters. Each character has exactly 3 special moves. Players participate in a battle in three different modes. The game allows for a one on one match, team matches or elimination tournament matches. There can be up to 8 fighters simultaneously on screen. There can be up to 4 human players on the same game. Playing with a joystick is also an available option, making the game more versatile.

Legacy
Little Fighter 2 is the sequel to Little Fighter. It was created by Marti Wong and Starsky Wong in 1999. After the release, it had several updates. In 2005, Marti Wong collaborated with Oscar Chu, to release the MMO sequel Little Fighter Online.

References

1995 video games
Beat 'em ups
DOS games
DOS-only games
Free-to-play video games
Free online games
Video games developed in Hong Kong